Peter Fleming and John McEnroe were the defending champions and won in the final 6–7, 7–6, 6–1 against Sherwood Stewart and Ferdi Taygan.

Seeds

  Peter Fleming /  John McEnroe (champions)
  Sherwood Stewart /  Ferdi Taygan (final)
  Paul Kronk /  Peter McNamara (first round)
  Bruce Manson /  Peter Rennert (quarterfinals)

Draw

External links
 1981 Custom Credit Australian Indoor Championships Doubles draw

Doubles